Cyperus rupicola is a species of sedge that is native to eastern parts of Australia.

See also 
 List of Cyperus species

References 

rupicola
Plants described in 1939
Flora of Queensland
Flora of New South Wales
Taxa named by Stanley Thatcher Blake